Micractaeon koptawelilensis is a species of land snail, terrestrial gastropod mollusks in the superfamily Achatinoidea (according to the taxonomy of the Gastropoda by Bouchet & Rocroi, 2005).

Micractaeon koptawelilensis is the only species in the genus Micractaeon. Micractaeon is the type genus of the family Micractaeonidae, and Micractaeon is the only genus in the family Micractaeonidae. This family has no subfamilies.

Distribution
The distribution of Micractaeon koptawelilensis includes tropical Africa: Ghana, Cameroon, eastern and southeastern Zaïre, Malawi, eastern Zambia, Uganda, Kenya and Tanzania.

The type locality is Mount Elgon, Kenya.

Description 
The width of the shell is 0.7-1.3 mm. The height of the shell is 1.1-2.2 mm.

Ecology 
Micractaeon koptawelilensis inhabits forests. These snails are found in leaf litter samples.

Footnotes

References

 
Gastropods described in 1934
Monotypic gastropod genera